Ella in London is a 1974 live album by Ella Fitzgerald, accompanied by a quartet led by the pianist Tommy Flanagan.

It is significant as Fitzgerald's only live album recorded in England, although a decade earlier she had recorded four songs for her 1964 album Hello, Dolly! in London. This live date was recorded at Ronnie Scott's Jazz Club in Soho.

Track listing
 "Sweet Georgia Brown" (Ben Bernie, Kenneth Casey, Maceo Pinkard)  – 3:15
 "They Can't Take That Away from Me" (George Gershwin, Ira Gershwin)  – 4:12
 "Ev'ry Time We Say Goodbye" (Cole Porter)  – 2:57
 "The Man I Love" (G. Gershwin, I. Gershwin)  – 8:10
 "It Don't Mean a Thing (If It Ain't Got That Swing)" (Duke Ellington, Irving Mills)  – 7:25
 "You've Got a Friend" (Carole King)  – 6:46
 "Lemon Drop" (George Wallington)  – 3:48
 "The Very Thought of You" (Ray Noble)  – 4:13
 "Happy Blues" (Ella Fitzgerald)  – 6:00

Personnel
Recorded April 11, 1974 at Ronnie Scott's, London, England:
 Ella Fitzgerald - vocals
 Tommy Flanagan Quartet:
 Tommy Flanagan - piano
 Joe Pass - guitar
 Keter Betts - double bass
 Bobby Durham - drums

References

Ella Fitzgerald live albums
Albums produced by Norman Granz
1974 live albums
Pablo Records live albums
Albums recorded at Ronnie Scott's Jazz Club